Claughton may refer to:

Places

United Kingdom
Claughton, Lancaster
Claughton, Wyre (also known as Claughton-on-Brock)
Claughton, Merseyside
Claughton (ward), an electoral ward of the Wirral Metropolitan Borough Council

United States
Claughton Island, another name for Brickell Key, Miami, Florida

Persons
Sir Gilbert Claughton, 1st Baronet, chairman of the London and North Western Railway
George Claughton, rugby league footballer of the 1970s and 1980s for Castleford
Hugh Claughton, British cricketer
John Alan Claughton, British cricketer
Piers Calverley Claughton, British bishop
Thomas Legh Claughton, British academic, poet and clergyman
Thomas Claughton (MP) British MP
Gruffydd Evans, Baron Evans of Claughton, British solicitor and politician

Other 
 LNWR Claughton Class, steam locomotives, named after Sir Gilbert Claughton